Kickin Momma is an iOS game developed by Canadian studio Hothead Games Inc. and released on August 4, 2011.

Critical reception
The game has a Metacritic score of 85% based on 5 critic reviews.

TouchArcade wrote " Kickin Momma comes with enough levels to keep you busy for some time, especially if you go back to earn a gold medal on each one. Plus, there's Game Center achievements and leaderboards that increase the replay value even further. " Appsafari said " The only downside to this game is that it does get a little repetitive, and that may annoy some. " 148Apps wrote " Whether you know the games that inspired Kickin Momma or not, it stands on its own ugly workbooks as a wonderful addictive monster-kickin' good time. " AppSpy said " Kickin Momma has a lot of charm and looks great, but some gameplay issues stop this from being the great title it could be. " Slide To Play wrote " Kickin Momma is fun, but it lives in the shadow of Peggle. "

References

2011 video games
IOS games
IOS-only games
Puzzle video games
Video games developed in Canada